Rudolf Jugert (1907–1979) was a German film director.

Selected filmography
 Film Without a Title (1948)
 Hallo, Fräulein! (1949)
 A Day Will Come (1950)
 Nights on the Road (1952)
 Illusion in a Minor Key (1952)
 Jonny Saves Nebrador (1953)
 Ein Herz spielt falsch (1953)
 The Great Test (1954)
 A Love Story (1954)
 Prisoners of Love (1954)
 Crown Prince Rudolph's Last Love (1955)
 Roses in Autumn (1955)
 Nina (1956)
 A Piece of Heaven (1957)
 Love Now, Pay Later (1959)
 The Scarlet Baroness (1959)
 Axel Munthe, The Doctor of San Michele (1962)
 Doctor Sibelius (1962)
 The River Line (1964)
 Hugenberg – Gegen die Republik (1967, TV film)
 Brückenallee Nr. 3 (1967, TV film)
 Berliner Blockade (1968, TV film)
 Verratener Widerstand – Das Funkspiel der deutschen Abwehr in Holland (1969, TV film)
  (1972, TV series)
 Der Bastian (1973, TV series)
  (1977, TV series)
  (1978–1979, TV series)
  (1979, TV film)

References

External links

1907 births
1979 deaths
Mass media people from Lower Saxony
Film people from Hanover
Best Director German Film Award winners
German film directors